Kotarangada Prabhu "KP" Appanna (born 20 December 1988) is an Indian cricketer who plays for Karnataka and Royal Challengers Bangalore as a specialist slow left-arm orthodox bowler and a right-handed batsman.

Early life
Appanna was born in Virajpet, Kodagu, Karnataka.

Cricket career
In 2001 Appanna represented Karnataka at Under-14 level, later playing at Under-15, Under-17 and Under-19 level.

Appanna made his first-class debut for Karnataka as a 17-year-old in 2006 against Baroda, taking two wickets in the first innings in which he bowled. He made four further appearances in the competition, as Karnakata finished second in Elite Group A. In February 2007, Appanna made his first of his four Under-19 Test appearance for India against New Zealand.

In 2007 he played for India Under-19s. He has also represented South Zone. 

He was selected in the squad for Royal Challengers Bangalore for the 2009 Indian Premier League. He played again for Bangalore in the 2010 tournament, however was not contracted for 2011. In January 2012 he signed for the 2012 tournament after a strong season for Karnataka.

References

External links
KP Appanna – Cricinfo profile
KP Appanna – CricketArchive profile
KP Appanna – RCB profile

1988 births
Living people
Indian cricketers
Karnataka cricketers
South Zone cricketers
Royal Challengers Bangalore cricketers
Kodava people
People from Kodagu district
Cricketers from Karnataka